John Bentley (born 16 November 1957) is an Australian rower. He competed in the men's coxless four event at the 1984 Summer Olympics.

References

External links
 

1957 births
Living people
Australian male rowers
Olympic rowers of Australia
Rowers at the 1984 Summer Olympics
Place of birth missing (living people)